David Gwyn Thomas (born 26 September 1957) is a Welsh former professional footballer who played as a midfielder.

Career
After starting his career with West End in Swansea, he joined Leeds United, making his debut for the club as a substitute on 26 April 1975 away at Wolverhampton Wanderers. He made 103 appearances for Leeds before transferring to Barnsley in March 1984 for £40,000.

Thomas played 230 times in all competitions for Barnsley, breaking his leg in 1989, before joining Hull City for £25,000 in March 1990.

Thomas finished his career at Carlisle United in 1992.

International career
Thomas made three appearances for Wales' U21 side. Thomas received a call-up to the senior Wales team, but he was forced to pull out due to injury.

References

1957 births
Living people
Barnsley F.C. players
Carlisle United F.C. players
Hull City A.F.C. players
Leeds United F.C. players
West End F.C. players
Wales under-21 international footballers
Welsh footballers
People educated at Gowerton Grammar School
Association football midfielders